Rowing competitions at the 2008 Summer Olympics in Beijing were held from August 9 to August 17, at the Shunyi Olympic Rowing-Canoeing Park.

Qualification

Medal table

Medal summary

Men's events

Women's events

See also 
Rowing at the 2008 Summer Paralympics

References

External links

FISA - International Rowing Federation
Rowing medal Standings from the official Beijing Olympics website.
Rowing – Official Results Book

 
2008 Summer Olympics events
2008
Olympics
Rowing competitions in China